Paul Gibier (1851–1900) was a French doctor and bacteriologist, a researcher into contagious diseases, who founded the New York Pasteur Institute. This was a pioneering private research laboratory concerned with developing bio-medical cures including vaccines and anti-toxins. He was also known for his interest in psychic phenomena.

Early years

Paul Gibier was born in France in 1851. He worked in a machine shop, served in the French cavalry in Africa and worked as a clerk for a railway company. He then attended the University of Paris where he obtained a degree in medicine. His doctoral theses of 1884 was on rabies in animals, and was supervised by one of Louis Pasteur's friends. Soon after he graduated the French government sent him to Germany to investigate "the organization of laboratories for medical research." Gibier received a gold medal for his investigations into an outbreak of cholera in Spain, and was made a Chevalier of the Legion of Honour for his work on cholera in the south of France.

In Paris Gibier formed a circle of people interested in Spiritualism, which included Caroline de Barrau. In 1887 Gibier published Le spiritisme (fakirisme occidental), a critical and experimental study that included discussion of mediums, North American Indians and Hindu Fakirs. In this book, in which he claimed to be scientifically impartial and apparently reported experiments objectively, he indulged in violently anti-Catholic views. In 1889 Gibier published his Physiologie transcendantale: Analyse des choses in which he described his research into psychological physiology, including careful studies of hypnotism, telepathy, duplication and so on.

Gibier was sent by the French government to study yellow fever in Florida and Havana. He hoped to find the yellow fever microbe that had been reported by Dr. Domingos José Freire of the Rio de Janeiro faculty of medicine. He reached Havana in November 1887, but was unable to find the micro-organisms in the blood of victims that had been reported by Freire. Gibier did find a bacillus in the intestine of a victim that seemed a possible cause of the disease, but further tests did not confirm this. He traveled from Havana to Florida by way of New York due to quarantine regulations. He settled in New York in 1889.

New York Pasteur Institute

In 1890 Gibier founded the Pasteur Institute in New York for inoculation of people who had been bitten by rabid animals. The institute, headed by Paul Gibier and with Dr. C. Van Schaick as assistant and Dr. A. Liautard as consulting veterinarian, opened on 18 February 1890. In the year that followed 828 people went for treatment, of whom 643 were found to not be rabid. 185 were inoculated, of whom none died. Those who could not afford to pay were treated free.

Gibier emerged as a scientific impresario. He had the ability to win public interest in laboratory work and to gain financial and social support for founding the innovative independent laboratory that could undertake research and development of bio-medical cures. His institute laid the foundation for the modern bio-medical industry. Gibier may have originated the idea of using serotherapy in oncology when in 1893 he submitted the proposition to the Paris Academy of Sciences "to infuse to an animal, the juice of human tumor and to use the blood or the serum of this animal to infuse in the human harboring this tumor."

Gibier successfully improvised new methods of culturing microbes and producing sera and antitoxins. In October 1893 a new building on Central Park West was formally dedicated, specially built for the institute. In December 1893 Gibier was the subject of a feature article in the New York Times. He became a member of the New York Academy of Medicine and of the Medical Association of New York. In 1895 he bought a  farm on the Nyack Turnpike, on the outskirts of Suffern, New York. There he set up a "Pasteur Farm" where he bred animals for research and production of anti-toxins. A large wood and stone frame sanitorium was built in 1898 for patients, particularly those suffering from tuberculosis.

Gibier edited the Therapeutic Review. This quarterly journal, later renamed the Bulletin of the New York Pasteur Institute, included accounts of studies by Gibier and his colleagues, translations of medical articles from French and German, reports on rabies treatments, and advertisements for medical devices and products for practitioners, including antitoxins and serum remedies. His institute was the first in the United States to produce a diphtheria antitoxin.

Writing in the North American review Gibier advanced the view that the medical "priest" should lead the movement from "sentimental" to "scientific" religion. He thought that only the doctor could diagnose diseases such as socialism and anarchy, and that with his knowledge of genetics he could "contribute to the purification of the race" through marriage counseling. In June 1900 Gibier was killed in an accident with a runaway carriage. The Banner of Light said that spiritualism had lost one of its truest friends with the transition of Dr. Gibier.

Works

References

Sources

External links
 

1851 births
1900 deaths
French bacteriologists
French spiritualists